Dagmara "Daga" Wozniak (born July 1, 1988) is an American saber fencer. Wozniak was named to the U.S. Olympic team at the 2008 Summer Olympics in women's saber competition as a substitute, and as a competitor at the 2012 and 2016 Summer Olympics. As of the summer of 2016, she was ranked as one of the top 10 saber fencers in the world.

Early life and education
Her parents are Gregory and Irena Wozniak and she has an older sister, Zuzanna. She was born in Wrocław, Poland. When Wozniak was one year old, she immigrated to the United States with her parents. The family settled in Avenel, New Jersey, Wozniak's hometown.

Wozniak graduated from Colonia High School in Woodbridge Township, New Jersey in 2006. She was the New Jersey high school sabre champion in 2005. She went on to attend St. John's University, where she majored in Biology.

Fencing career

Wozniak began fencing at age 9 at the Polish American Fencing School (PAFS) in Linden, New Jersey.  She has trained at the Manhattan Fencing Center since high school, and her coach is Yury Gelman. She won three team medals at the Junior World Fencing Championships.

Wozniak was an Olympic alternate in the 2008 Olympic Games in Beijing but did not compete. She became a full member of the U.S. team at the 2012 Olympic Games and placed eighth, losing to Sofiya Velikaya of Russia in the quarterfinals by the score of 15–13. It was later revealed that she had fenced with a partially torn Achilles tendon.

After winning bronze medals in the team competition at the  2011 World Fencing Championships, and the 2012 and 2013 Senior World Championships, Wozniak won a gold medal with Team USA in 2014.

As of the summer of 2016, she was ranked among the top 10 saber fencers in the world. She represented the United States at the 2016 Summer Olympics in Rio de Janeiro. The team won a bronze medal.

She has qualified to represent the United States in fencing at the 2020 Olympics in Tokyo in 2021.

References

External links
Wozniak on Twitter
Wozniak on Facebook
 
"'Pretty Powerful': The Olympic Fencer Dagmara Wozniak's Fierce Beauty", Allure, July 28, 2016 (video)

1988 births
Living people
American female sabre fencers
Colonia High School alumni
Fencers at the 2011 Pan American Games
Fencers at the 2012 Summer Olympics
Fencers at the 2015 Pan American Games
Fencers at the 2016 Summer Olympics
Polish emigrants to the United States
People from Woodbridge Township, New Jersey
St. John's University (New York City) alumni
American people of Polish descent
Medalists at the 2016 Summer Olympics
Olympic bronze medalists for the United States in fencing
Pan American Games medalists in fencing
Pan American Games gold medalists for the United States
Sportspeople from Middlesex County, New Jersey
Sportspeople from Wrocław
St. John's Red Storm fencers
Medalists at the 2011 Pan American Games
Medalists at the 2015 Pan American Games
Fencers at the 2020 Summer Olympics
21st-century American women